Grace was a restaurant in the West Loop neighborhood in Chicago, Illinois, United States. It had been ranked 3 stars by the Michelin Guide each year since 2015. Before closing on December 20, 2017, Alinea and Grace  were the only Chicago restaurants with  three  Michelin stars.

History 
Original head chef Curtis Duffy and his business partner Michael Muser opened Grace in December 2012. Duffy had previously worked at Charlie Trotter’s and was chef de cuisine at Alinea when it opened in 2004. In the years prior to opening Grace, he maintained a two star Michelin rating while the head chef at Avenues in the Peninsula Hotel until closing the restaurant in 2011.

Grace has maintained a Michelin Guide three-star restaurant status since 2014 and to date is only the third restaurant in Chicago ever to earn three Michelin stars after Alinea and the since-shuttered L2O.

In the 2015 documentary For Grace, Curtis Duffy and his life journey to the creation of Grace are featured;  originally from Ohio, as a teenager Duffy overcame his father's murder of his mother and subsequent suicide.

As of late 2016, Grace edged out Alinea as Chicago's most expensive restaurant and one of the most costly in the United States.

In December 2017, Curtis Duffy and Michael Muser left Grace after a dispute with restaurant owner Michael Olszewski. Shortly afterward, Olszewski closed the restaurant.

Awards and honors
Michelin Guide, 3 Star Rating
Five Diamond Award, AAA
Forbes Travel Guide, 5 Star Rating
Robb Report, Best of the Best 2013: Dining
Chicago Tribune, 4 Star Rating
Chicago Magazine, Best New Restaurant
Best Chef: Great Lakes 2016 (Curtis Duffy) James Beard Foundation

See also
List of Michelin starred restaurants

References

External links
Restaurant website (archived)

Defunct restaurants in Chicago
Michelin Guide starred restaurants in Illinois
2012 establishments in Illinois
Restaurants established in 2012
2017 disestablishments in Illinois
Restaurants disestablished in 2017